Mircea Stoenescu (11 October 1943 – 5 January 2022) was a Romanian football centre-back, manager and referee.

Career
Mircea Stoenescu was born on 11 October 1943 in Bucharest, Romania. He started his career playing at the junior squads of Dinamo București, winning a national title at children level in 1959 and one in junior level in 1961. He made his Divizia A debut on 9 July 1961, playing for Dinamo in a 2–0 home victory against Steagul Roșu Brașov. In the following season he made one Divizia A appearance as the club won the title, after which he went to play two seasons at Divizia B club, Dinamo Obor București and another two seasons at Divizia A club, Dinamo Pitești. In 1965, Stoenescu returned to Dinamo București for a 8 seasons spell, in which he won two titles, in the first he contributed with 20 appearances and in the second he played 8 games and scored one goal, also helping the club win a cup. He made his last Divizia A appearance on 5 November 1972, playing for Dinamo București in a 1–0 away loss against ASA Târgu Mureș. Stoenescu ended his playing career, spending two seasons at Divizia B team, Dinamo Slatina, having a total of 158 Divizia A matches with 11 goals scored and 7 appearances in European competitions (including 4 appearances in the Inter-Cities Fairs Cup). After he ended his playing career, Stoenescu worked for a while as a coach at Dinamo Victoria București in the lower leagues of Romania and as a referee, arbitrating 39 matches over the course of six seasons in Romania's top-league Divizia A. He was also president at Dinamo București. Mircea Stoenescu died in Drăgășani on 5 January 2022, at the age of 78.

Honours
Dinamo București
Divizia A: 1961–62, 1970–71, 1972–73
Cupa României: 1967–68, runner-up 1968–69, 1969–70, 1970–71
Dinamo Pitești
Cupa României runner-up: 1964–65

Notes

References

External links

Mircea Stoenescu at Labtof.ro

1943 births
2022 deaths
Footballers from Bucharest
Romanian footballers
Association football defenders
Liga I players
Liga II players
FC Argeș Pitești players
FC Dinamo București players
Victoria București players
Romanian football managers
Romanian football referees
Romanian sports executives and administrators